The Wizarding World (previously known as J. K. Rowling's Wizarding World) is a fantasy media franchise and shared fictional universe centred on the Harry Potter novel series by J. K. Rowling. A series of films have been in production since 2000, and in that time eleven films have been produced—eight are adaptations of the Harry Potter novels and three are part of the Fantastic Beasts series. The films are owned and distributed by Warner Bros. Pictures. The series has collectively grossed over $9.6 billion at the global box office, making it the fourth-highest-grossing film franchise of all time (behind the Marvel Cinematic Universe, Star Wars and Spider-Man).

David Heyman and his company Heyday Films have produced every film in the Wizarding World series. Chris Columbus and Mark Radcliffe served as producers on Harry Potter and the Prisoner of Azkaban, David Barron began producing the films with Harry Potter and the Order of the Phoenix in 2007 and ending with Harry Potter and the Deathly Hallows – Part 2 in 2011, and Rowling produced the final two films in the Harry Potter series. Heyman, Rowling, Steve Kloves and Lionel Wigram have produced both films in the Fantastic Beasts series. The films are written and directed by several individuals and feature large, often ensemble, casts. Many of the actors, including Daniel Radcliffe, Rupert Grint, Emma Watson, Tom Felton, Michael Gambon, Ralph Fiennes, Alan Rickman, Maggie Smith, Helena Bonham Carter, Gary Oldman, Eddie Redmayne, Katherine Waterston, Alison Sudol, and Dan Fogler star in numerous films. Additionally, Jude Law and Johnny Depp feature in two films each. Soundtrack albums have been released for each of the films. The franchise also includes a stage production (Harry Potter and the Cursed Child), a digital publication, a video game label and The Wizarding World of Harry Potter–themed areas at several Universal Parks & Resorts amusement parks around the world.

The first film in the Wizarding World was Harry Potter and the Philosopher's Stone (2001), which was followed by seven Harry Potter sequels, beginning with Harry Potter and the Chamber of Secrets in 2002 and ending with Harry Potter and the Deathly Hallows – Part 2 in 2011, nearly ten years after the first film's release. Fantastic Beasts and Where to Find Them (2016) is the first film in the spin-off/prequel Fantastic Beasts series. A sequel, titled Fantastic Beasts: The Crimes of Grindelwald, was released on 16 November 2018. A third film, Fantastic Beasts: The Secrets of Dumbledore was released on 15 April 2022. The first Wizarding World-branded narrative video game, Hogwarts Legacy, was released in early 2023. Warner Bros. is also planning to develop a television series, set in the Wizarding World, to debut on HBO Max.

Harry Potter films

Harry Potter and the Philosopher's Stone (2001)

Harry Potter, a seemingly ordinary eleven-year-old boy, is actually a wizard and survivor of Lord Voldemort's attempted rise to power. Harry is rescued by Rubeus Hagrid from his unkind Muggle relatives, Uncle Vernon, Aunt Petunia, and his cousin Dudley, and takes his place at Hogwarts School of Witchcraft and Wizardry, where he and his friends Ron Weasley and Hermione Granger become entangled in the mystery of the Philosopher's Stone, which is being kept within the school.

In October 1998, Warner Bros. purchased the film rights to the first four novels of the Harry Potter fantasy series by J. K. Rowling for a seven-figure sum, after a pitch from producer David Heyman. Warner Bros. took particular notice of Rowling's wishes and thoughts about the films when drafting her contract. One of her principal stipulations was that they are shot in Britain with an all-British cast, which has been generally adhered to. On 8 August 2000, the then-unknown Daniel Radcliffe and newcomers Rupert Grint and Emma Watson were selected to play Harry Potter, Ron Weasley and Hermione Granger, respectively. Chris Columbus was hired to direct the film adaptation of Philosopher's Stone, with Steve Kloves selected to write the screenplay. Filming began on 29 September 2000 at Leavesden Film Studios and concluded on 23 March 2001, with final work being done in July. Principal photography took place on 2 October 2000 at North Yorkshire's Goathland railway station.  Warner Bros. had initially planned to release the film over 4 July 2001 weekend, making for such a short production window that several proposed directors removed themselves from consideration. Because of time constraints, the date was put back, and Harry Potter and the Philosopher's Stone was released in the United Kingdom and the United States on 16 November 2001.

Harry Potter and the Chamber of Secrets (2002)

Harry, Ron, and Hermione return to Hogwarts for their second year, but a mysterious chamber, hidden in the school, is opened leaving students and ghosts petrified by an unknown agent. They must solve the mystery of the chamber, and discover its entrance to find and defeat the true culprit.

Columbus and Kloves returned as director, and screenwriter for the film adaptation of Chamber of Secrets. Just three days after the wide release of the first film, production began on 19 November 2001 in Surrey, England, with filming continuing on location on the Isle of Man and at several other locations in Great Britain. Leavesden Film Studios in London made several scenes for Hogwarts. Principal photography concluded in the summer of 2002. The film spent until early October in post-production. Harry Potter and the Chamber of Secrets premiered in the United Kingdom on 3 November 2002 before its wide release on 15 November, one year after the Philosopher's Stone.

Harry Potter and the Prisoner of Azkaban (2004)

A mysterious convict, Sirius Black, escapes from Azkaban and sets his sights on Hogwarts, where dementors are stationed to protect Harry and his peers. Harry learns more about his past and his connection with the escaped prisoner.

Columbus, the director of the two previous films, decided not to return to helm the third instalment, but remained as a producer alongside Heyman. Warner Bros. then drew up a three-name short list for Columbus' replacement, which comprised Callie Khouri, Kenneth Branagh (who played Gilderoy Lockhart in Chamber of Secrets) and the eventual director Alfonso Cuarón. Cuarón was initially nervous about accepting the job having not read any of the books, or seen the films, but later signed on after reading the series and  connecting immediately with the story. Michael Gambon replaced Richard Harris, who played Albus Dumbledore in the previous two films, after Harris's death in October 2002. Gambon was unconcerned with bettering or copying Harris, instead provided his own interpretation, including using a slight Irish accent for the role. He completed his scenes in three weeks. Gary Oldman was cast in the key role of Sirius Black in February 2003. Principal photography began on 24 February 2003, at Leavesden Film Studios, and concluded in October 2003. Harry Potter and the Prisoner of Azkaban premiered on 23 May 2004 in New York. It was released in the United Kingdom on 31 May, and in the United States on 4 June. It was the first film in the series to be released in both conventional and IMAX theatres.

Harry Potter and the Goblet of Fire (2005)

After the Quidditch World Cup, Harry arrives back at Hogwarts and finds himself entered in the Triwizard Tournament, a challenging competition involving completing three dangerous tasks. Harry is forced to compete with three other wizards chosen by the Goblet of Fire  Fleur Delacour, Viktor Krum, and Cedric Diggory.

In August 2003, British film director Mike Newell was chosen to direct the film after Prisoner of Azkaban director Alfonso Cuarón announced that he would not direct the sequel. Heyman returned to produce, and Kloves again wrote the screenplay. Principal photography began on 4 May 2004. Scenes involving the film's principal actors began shooting on 25 June 2004 at England's Leavesden Film Studios. Harry Potter and the Goblet of Fire premiered on 6 November 2005 in London, and was released in the United Kingdom and the United States on 18 November. Goblet of Fire was the first film in the series to receive a PG-13 rating by the Motion Picture Association of America (MPAA) for "sequences of fantasy violence and frightening images," M by the Australian Classification Board (ACB), and a 12A by the British Board of Film Classification (BBFC) for its dark themes, fantasy violence, threat and frightening images.

Harry Potter and the Order of the Phoenix (2007)

Harry returns for his fifth year at Hogwarts and discovers that the Wizarding World is in denial of Voldemort's return. He takes matters into his own hands and starts a secret organisation to stand up against the regime of Hogwarts' "High Inquisitor" Dolores Umbridge, as well as to learn practical Defence Against the Dark Arts (D.A.D.A) for the forthcoming battle.

Daniel Radcliffe confirmed he would return as Harry Potter in May 2005, with Rupert Grint, Emma Watson, Matthew Lewis (Neville Longbottom), and Bonnie Wright (Ginny Weasley) confirmed to return in November 2005. In February 2006, Helen McCrory was cast as Bellatrix Lestrange, but dropped out due to her pregnancy. In May 2006, Helena Bonham Carter was cast in her place. Ralph Fiennes reprises his role as Lord Voldemort. British television director David Yates was chosen to direct the film after Goblet of Fire director Newell, as well as Jean-Pierre Jeunet, Guillermo del Toro, Matthew Vaughn and Mira Nair, turned down offers. Kloves, the screenwriter of the first four Harry Potter films, had other commitments and Michael Goldenberg, who had been considered for screenwriter of the series' first film, filled in to write the script. Principal photography began on 7 February 2006, and concluded at the start of December 2006. Filming was put on a two-month hiatus starting in May 2006 so Radcliffe could sit his AS Levels and Watson could sit her GCSE exams. Live-action filming took place in England and Scotland for exterior locations and at Leavesden Film Studios for interior locations. Harry Potter and the Order of the Phoenix had its world premiere on 28 June 2007 in Tokyo, Japan, and a UK premiere on 3 July 2007 at the Odeon Leicester Square in London. The film was released in the United Kingdom on 12 July, and the United States on 11 July.

Harry Potter and the Half-Blood Prince (2009)

Voldemort and his Death Eaters are increasing their terror upon the Wizarding and Muggle worlds. Needing him for an important reason, Headmaster Dumbledore persuades his old friend Horace Slughorn to return to his prior post at Hogwarts. During Slughorn's Potions class, Harry takes possession of a strangely annotated school textbook, previously owned by the "Half-Blood Prince".

In July 2007, it was announced that Yates would return as director. Kloves returned to write the screenplay after skipping out of the fifth film, with Heyman and David Barron back as producers. Watson considered not returning for the film, but eventually signed on after Warner Bros. moved the production schedule to accommodate her exam dates. Principal photography began on 24 September 2007, and concluded on 17 May 2008. Though Radcliffe, Gambon and Jim Broadbent (Slughorn) started shooting in late September 2007, other cast members started much later: Watson did not begin until December 2007, Alan Rickman (Severus Snape) until January 2008, and Bonham Carter until February 2008. Harry Potter and the Half-Blood Prince had its world premiere on 6 July 2009 in Tokyo, Japan, and was released in the United Kingdom and the United States on 15 July.

Harry Potter and the Deathly Hallows – Part 1 (2010)

Harry, Ron, and Hermione leave Hogwarts behind and set out to find and destroy Lord Voldemort's secret to immortality – the Horcruxes. The trio undergo a long journey with many obstacles in their path including Death Eaters, Snatchers, the mysterious Deathly Hallows, and Harry's connection with the Dark Lord's mind becoming ever stronger.

Originally scheduled for a single theatrical release, on 13 March 2008, Warner Bros. announced that the film adaptation of Deathly Hallows would be split into two parts to do justice to the book and out of respect for its fans. Yates, director of the previous two films, was confirmed to return as director, and Kloves was confirmed as screenwriter. For the first time in the series, Rowling was credited as a producer alongside Heyman and Barron, however Yates noted that her participation in the filmmaking process did not change from the previous films. Pre-production began on 26 January 2009, while principal photography began on 19 February at Leavesden Studios, where the previous six instalments were filmed. Pinewood Studios became the second studio location for shooting the seventh film.

Harry Potter and the Deathly Hallows – Part 2 (2011)

Harry, Ron, and Hermione continue their search to find and destroy the remaining Horcruxes, as Harry prepares for the final battle against Voldemort.

The film was announced in March 2008 as Harry Potter and the Deathly Hallows – Part 2, the second of two cinematic parts. It was also revealed that Yates would direct the film and that Kloves would write the screenplay. Kloves started work on the second part's script in April 2009, after the first part's script was completed. Deathly Hallows – Part 2 was filmed back-to-back with Deathly Hallows – Part 1 from 19 February 2009 to 12 June 2010, and treated as if it were one film during principal photography. Reshoots were confirmed to begin in the winter of 2010 for the film's final, and epilogue scenes, which had originally taken place at London King's Cross station. The filming took place at Leavesden Film Studios on 21 December 2010, marking the end of the Harry Potter series after ten years of filming.

The film had its world premiere on 7 July 2011 in Trafalgar Square in London, and a U.S. premiere on 11 July at Lincoln Center in New York City. Although filmed in 2D, the film was converted into 3D in post-production and was released in both RealD 3D and IMAX 3D, becoming the first film in the series to be released in this format. The film was released on 15 July in the United Kingdom and the United States.

Fantastic Beasts films

Fantastic Beasts and Where to Find Them (2016)

In 1926, Newt Scamander arrives in New York City with his magically expanded briefcase which houses a number of dangerous creatures and their habitats. When some creatures escape from his briefcase, Newt must battle to correct the mistake, and the horrors of the resultant increase in violence, fear, and tension felt between magical and non-magical people (No-Maj).

On 12 September 2013, Warner Bros. announced that J. K. Rowling was writing a script based on her book Fantastic Beasts and Where to Find Them and the adventures of its fictional author Newt Scamander, set seventy years before the adventures of Harry Potter. The film would mark her screenwriting debut and is planned as the first movie in a new series. According to Rowling, after Warner Bros. suggested an adaptation, she wrote a rough draft of the script in twelve days. She said, "It wasn't a great draft but it did show the shape of how it might look. So that is how it all started." In March 2014, it was revealed that a trilogy was scheduled with the first instalment set in New York. The film sees the return of producer David Heyman, as well as writer Steve Kloves, both veterans of the Potter film series. In June 2015, Eddie Redmayne was cast in the lead role of Newt Scamander, the Wizarding World's preeminent magizoologist. Other cast members include: Katherine Waterston as Tina Goldstein, Alison Sudol as Queenie Goldstein, Dan Fogler as Jacob Kowalski, Ezra Miller as Credence Barebone, Samantha Morton as Mary Lou Barebone, Jenn Murray as Chastity Barebone, Faith Wood-Blagrove as Modesty Barebone, and Colin Farrell as Percival Graves. Principal photography began on 17 August 2015, at Warner Bros. Studios, Leavesden. After two months, the production moved to St George's Hall in Liverpool, which was transformed into 1920s New York City. Fantastic Beasts and Where to Find Them was released worldwide on 18 November 2016.

Fantastic Beasts: The Crimes of Grindelwald (2018)

A few months have passed since the events of Fantastic Beasts and Where to Find Them. Gellert Grindelwald has escaped imprisonment and has begun gathering followers to his causeelevating wizards above all non-magical beings. Dumbledore must seek help from his former student Newt to put a stop to Grindelwald.

The film was announced in March 2014 as the second instalment in the series. In October 2016, it was revealed that Yates and Rowling would return as director, and screenwriter and co-producer, and Redmayne would be returning to play the lead role of Newt Scamander in  all the series' films. In November 2016, it was confirmed that Johnny Depp would reprise his role as Gellert Grindelwald from the first instalment. Later that same month it was also announced that Albus Dumbledore would be appearing in  future instalments, albeit with a younger actor for the prequel film series. In April 2017, it was confirmed that Jude Law had been cast as Dumbledore. The film takes place in New York City, Britain, and Paris. Principal photography began on 3 July 2017, at Warner Bros. Studios, Leavesden, and wrapped on 20 December 2017. Fantastic Beasts: The Crimes of Grindelwald was released on 16 November 2018.

Fantastic Beasts: The Secrets of Dumbledore (2022)

Several years after the events of The Crimes of Grindelwald, the story begins in the UK, the US and China and proceeds to take place partly in Berlin, Germany and partly in Bhutan, Asia and leads up to the Wizarding World's involvement in World War II.

The third instalment in the franchise shows protagonist Newt Scamander and company returning for another adventurous journey through the wizarding world, attempting to defeat the maniacal Gellert Grindelwald despite Albus Dumbledore unable to fight against him. Originally scheduled to begin filming in July 2019, and released in November 2020, production was pushed back to late 2019 to allow more time polishing the script and plan the future of the series. In 2018 on Twitter, J. K. Rowling promised that the third film would give answers to the questions left unsolved in the first two. In October 2019, Dan Fogler claimed that principal photography on the third film would begin in February 2020. In November 2019, it was announced that the script had been written by both J. K. Rowling and Steve Kloves, the latter of whom returned after being absent as a writer on the first two. On 16 March 2020, the very day that principal photography would begin, the COVID-19 pandemic prompted Warner Bros. to postpone production of its third Fantastic Beasts film. This made the film to be postponed again, from a 12 November 2021 to a 15 July 2022 release. On 20 August 2020, filming was confirmed to start in September. On 20 September 2020, Eddie Redmayne confirmed that filming was two weeks underway with safety precautions in place to keep the cast and crew safe from COVID-19. Johnny Depp announced on 6 November 2020 that he left the film at the request of Warner Bros. Studios. This was the result of Depp losing a libel lawsuit in the UK. On 25 November 2020, Warner Bros. announced that Mads Mikkelsen would replace Depp in the role of Grindelwald. On 3 February 2021, filming in the UK was shut down after a production member tested positive for COVID-19. Composer James Newton Howard confirmed later that month that production had wrapped filming. In September 2021, the film's release was pushed forward three months to 15 April 2022, alongside the announcement of the full title. It premiered one week early in a few European and Asian countries.

Future
In October 2016, Rowling announced that the Fantastic Beasts film series would be composed of five films, later confirming that the story of the series would consist of a sequence of events that occurred between the years of 1926 and 1945. In February 2022, producer David Heyman revealed that work on the script for Fantastic Beasts 4 had not begun yet. In April 2022, Variety reported that Warner Bros. greenlighting the final two installments would be dependent on the critical and commercial performance of The Secrets of Dumbledore.

In November 2022, it was reported that Warner Bros. Discovery was not actively planning to continue the film series or to develop any films related to the Wizarding World franchise.

Television
In January 2021, it was reported that Warner Bros. were reviewing pitches for a television series, set in the Wizarding World, to debut on HBO Max. In May 2022, the reports circulated about the announced meeting between Warner Bros. Discovery CEO David Zaslav and J.K. Rowling in their discussion for future HBO Max projects set within the Wizarding World.

Specials
TBS and Cartoon Network aired Harry Potter: Hogwarts Tournament of Houses on 28 November 2021 as part of the 20th anniversary celebrations. It was a bracket style quiz show where fans would compete for their Hogwarts house in teams of three. It featured four episodes and was hosted by Helen Mirren and included Harry Potter cast members: Tom Felton, Simon Fisher-Becker, Shirley Henderson, Luke Youngblood, along with other cameos like Pete Davidson and comedian Jay Leno.

Many members of the original cast reunited for Harry Potter 20th Anniversary: Return to Hogwarts, an HBO Max retrospective special to celebrate the 20th anniversary of Philosopher's Stone, which was released on 1 January 2022.

Recurring cast and characters

Notes

Music

Reception

Box office performance
, the first eleven Wizarding World films have collectively grossed over $9.6 billion at the global box office, making it the fourth-highest-grossing film franchise of all time behind the Marvel Cinematic Universe films, the Star Wars films and the Spider-Man films. The first ten films emerged as commercial successes at the box office with the majority of the films grossing over  $790 million, and all but The Prisoner of Azkaban and Fantastic Beasts at some point ranked among the ten highest-grossing films of all time. The Harry Potter films are the highest-grossing series based on a single property, earning over $7.7 billion at the box office; Harry Potter has also generated at least $3.9 billion in home video revenue, taking total consumer spending on the films to over $11 billion. Harry Potter also has a series average of over $1 billion per film when adjusted for inflation.

The Deathly Hallows – Part 2 grossed over $1.3 billion becoming the third-highest-grossing film of all time, the highest-grossing film in the Wizarding World franchise, and the highest-grossing film of 2011. In the United States and Canada, it set a single-day and opening-weekend record, with $91.1 million and $169.2 million. In addition, the film set a worldwide opening-weekend record with $483.2 million. The Philosopher's Stone and The Goblet of Fire were also the highest-grossing films of 2001 and 2005; while The Chamber of Secrets, The Prisoner of Azkaban, The Order of the Phoenix, and The Half-Blood Prince were the second highest-grossing films of 2002, 2004, 2007, and 2009. The Deathly Hallows – Part 1 was the third-highest-grossing film of 2010, (behind Toy Story 3 and Alice in Wonderland), Fantastic Beasts and Where to Find Them was the eighth highest-grossing film of 2016, and The Crimes of Grindelwald was the tenth highest-grossing film of 2018.  The Secrets of Dumbledore was the first film in the franchise to place outside the top ten grossing films of its release year.

Critical and public response
All of the films have been a success commercially and majority of the film's have been critically successful, making the franchise one of the major Hollywood "tent-poles" akin to James Bond, Star Wars, Indiana Jones, Lord of the Rings, Pirates of the Caribbean, Marvel Cinematic Universe and DC Extended Universe. The Harry Potter series is noted by audiences and critics for growing narratively complicated, visually darker and more mature as each film was released.

Accolades

Academy Awards
Seven of the ten films were nominated for a total of 14 Academy Awards. Fantastic Beasts and Where to Find Them won for Best Costume Design in 2017, becoming the first film in the Wizarding World to win an Academy Award. Before the win in 2017, the franchise was the most-snubbed, top-grossing franchise of all time at the Academy Awards, with 12 nominations and zero wins.

British Academy Film Awards
The franchise has earned a total of 34 nominations at the British Academy Film Awards presented at the annual BAFTAs, winning three. At the 64th British Academy Film Awards in February 2011, Rowling, producers Heyman and Barron, along with directors Yates, Newell and Cuarón collected the Michael Balcon Award for Outstanding British Contribution to Cinema in honour of the Harry Potter film series. The Harry Potter series was also recognised by the BAFTA Los Angeles Britannia Awards, with Yates winning the Britannia Award for Artistic Excellence in Directing for his four Harry Potter films.

Emmy Awards
Harry Potter 20th Anniversary: Return to Hogwarts received a nomination for Outstanding Variety Special (Pre-Recorded) at the 74th Primetime Emmy Awards as well as a nomination for Outstanding Picture Editing for Variety Programming at the 74th Primetime Creative Arts Emmy Awards. At the 1st Children's and Family Emmy Awards, Harry Potter: Hogwarts Tournament of Houses won the award for Outstanding Lighting Design for a Live Action Program and Helen Mirren won the award for Outstanding Host for hosting the series.<ref>{{cite web |date=December 10, 2022 |author=Abbey White |url= https://www.hollywoodreporter.com/tv/tv-news/childrens-and-family-creative-arts-emmys-winners-1235279464/ |title= Creative Arts Children's & Family Emmy Awards: 'Maya and the Three,' Sneakerella' Among Winners |website= The Hollywood Reporter |access-date= December 11, 2022 }}</ref>

Grammy Awards
The franchise has received a total of eight Grammy Award nominations; seven for films in the Harry Potter series with various composers nominated (John Williams, Nicholas Hooper, Alexandre Desplat) and one for the musical Harry Potter and the Cursed Child, composed by Imogen Heap.

Laurence Olivier AwardsHarry Potter and the Cursed Child garnered eleven Laurence Olivier Awards nominations at the 2017 ceremony, tying the record set in 2008 by Hairspray, and won a record-breaking nine: Best New Play, Best Director, Best Actor (Jamie Parker), Best Actress in a Supporting Role (Noma Dumezweni), Best Actor in a Supporting Role (Anthony Boyle), Best Costume Design, Best Set Design, Best Sound Design, and Best Lighting Design. The London production was also nominated for Best Theatre Choreographer and Outstanding Achievement in Music.

Tony AwardsHarry Potter and the Cursed Child received ten nominations at the 72nd Tony Awards, winning six awards: Best Play, Best Scenic Design in a Play, Best Costume Design in a Play, Best Lighting Design in a Play, Best Sound Design of a Play, and Best Direction of a Play. The play was also nominated for Best Performance by a Leading Actor in a Play (Parker), Best Performance by a Featured Actor in a Play (Boyle), Best Performance by a Featured Actress in a Play (Dumezweni), and Best Choreography.

Other media

Stage play

In December 2013, J. K. Rowling announced that she was working on a Harry Potter–based play, and in June 2015 it was officially titled Harry Potter and the Cursed Child. The two-part, West End stage play, written by British playwright Jack Thorne, is based on an original story by Thorne, John Tiffany and Rowling. It is directed by Tiffany with choreography by Steven Hoggett, set design by Christine Jones, costume design by Katrina Lindsay, lighting design by Neil Austin, music by Imogen Heap, and sound design by Gareth Fry. The story begins nineteen years after the events of Deathly Hallows and follows Harry Potter, now a Ministry of Magic employee, and his younger son Albus Severus Potter, who is about to attend Hogwarts. On 20 December 2015, it was announced that Jamie Parker, Noma Dumezweni and Paul Thornley would play Harry Potter, Hermione Granger and Ron Weasley respectively. The play debuted at the Palace Theatre, London on 7 June 2016 in previews, with the official opening on 30 July. The script was released in book form the day after the play's world premiere. The play opened on Broadway at the redesigned Lyric Theatre, New York City on 22 April 2018. Parker, Dumezweni, and Thornley reprised their roles on Broadway with Poppy Miller, Sam Clemmett, Alex Price, and Anthony Boyle also reprising their roles as Ginny Potter, Albus Potter, Draco Malfoy, and Scorpius Malfoy, respectively.

Digital publication

In June 2011, Rowling launched a website announcing an upcoming project called Pottermore, where all future Harry Potter projects, and all electronic downloads, would be concentrated. Pottermore opened to the general public on 14 April 2012. Pottermore allows users to be sorted, be chosen by their wand and play various minigames. The main purpose of the website was to allow the user to journey through the story with access to content not revealed by J.K. Rowling previously, with over 18,000 words of information on characters, places and objects in the Harry Potter universe. In September 2015, the website launched a newly designed site containing news, features and articles plus previously unreleased writing by Rowling and removed some features including the interactive Moment illustrations, House Cup and Sorting ceremony. A newly designed Sorting Ceremony was subsequently launched on 28 January 2016 in which users could reclaim their old house or be re-sorted.

Theme parks 

The Wizarding World of Harry Potter are a group of themed areas at Universal Parks & Resorts based on the Harry Potter'' media franchise, adapting elements from the film series and original novels by Rowling. The areas were designed by Universal Creative under an exclusive licence with Warner Bros. Entertainment. It opened on 18 June 2010 as an expansion to the Islands of Adventure theme park at Universal Orlando Resort in Orlando, Florida, and on 8 July 2014 at the Universal Studios Florida theme park.

On 15 July 2014, The Wizarding World of Harry Potter opened at the Universal Studios Japan theme park in Osaka, Japan. It includes the village of Hogsmeade, the Harry Potter and the Forbidden Journey ride, and the Flight of the Hippogriff roller coaster. On 7 April 2016, The Wizarding World of Harry Potter opened at the Universal Studios Hollywood theme park near Los Angeles, California. On 20 September 2021, The Wizarding World of Harry Potter opened at the Universal Studios Beijing theme park in Beijing, China.

Attractions

Warner Bros. Studio Tours – The Making of Harry Potter 

The Warner Bros. Studio Tour London – The Making of Harry Potter opened on 31 March 2012 in Leavesden, southeast England with a grand opening that featured many of the Harry Potter cast and crew. It houses a permanent exhibit of authentic costumes, props and sets utilized in the production of the Harry Potter films, as well as behind-the-scenes production of visual effects. Each tour session typically lasts three and a half hours, and the tour has the capacity to handle 6,000 visitors daily. TripAdvisor reported that it has been the highest-rated attraction worldwide every year since the tour opened. Announced in August 2020, Warner Bros. Studio Tour Tokyo – The Making of Harry Potter is an upcoming attraction in Tokyo, Japan scheduled to open in the first half of 2023.  Similar to its counterpart in London, the 30,000 square-meter attraction in Tokyo will offer visitors a walking tour through some of the recreated famous film sets including the Great Hall, the Forbidden Forest, and the Diagon Alley.

Harry Potter Shops 
The Harry Potter Shop at Platform 9 3/4 opened on 14 December 2012 and is located in King's Cross Station, London and next to it there is an opportunity to take a photo at the trolley. The Harry Potter Store New York opened on 3 June 2021 and consists of 3 floors with an area over 20,000 square feet. It includes unique VR experiences. The Harry Potter Shop in Gatwick Airport, England is located in its North Terminal and the store covers 614 square feet. It opened to the public on 22 November 2018. The Harry Potter Shop in Heathrow Airport, England is located on Terminal 5, Level 3 and covers 1000 square feet. It opened on 16 November and covered 600 square feet and then expanded to cover 1000 square feet and re-opened on 9 August 2018.

There are also unofficial stores based on the Wizarding World and J.K Rowling including: an Italian shop in Rimini, Emporio Stregato.

Harry Potter: The Exhibition 

Harry Potter: The Exhibition is a travelling exhibition ran by GES that originally opened in April 2009 at the Museum of Science and Industry in Chicago, United States. It travelled across 14 countries with its last stop being in Lisbon, Portugal until March 2020 when it closed early due to COVID-19. It was announced early 2021 that the exhibition would be rebooted and ran by Imagine Exhibitions and is set to open in 2022. It is currently open in Franklin Institute, Philadelphia. It will be opening in Paris Expo Porte de Versailles, Paris on Spring 2023.

Harry Potter Photographic Exhibition 
The Harry Potter Photographic Exhibition opened on 12 July 2021 in Covent Garden, London. It includes a display of behind-the-scenes images and features London's only Butterbeer Bar. It is closing on 15th December 2022, after more than a year of being opened.

History of Magic Exhibition 
The History of Magic was an exhibition which was at the British Library from 20 October 2017 to 28 February 2018 as part of 20th anniversary celebrations. The British Library also installed smaller displays on the same topic in 22 libraries across the United Kingdom. The exhibition was a collaboration between the British Library, Bloomsbury, and author J. K. Rowling. There was also a similar exhibition in New York City which opened on 5 October 2018 to 27 January 2019. While some of the same artefacts from the British Library were displayed, additional materials dealing with real-word magic in the Americas were shown. On 27 February 2018, as the British Library was preparing to close the original exhibition, Google made the exhibition available online world-wide using their Google Arts & Culture platform.

Fantastic Beasts: The Wonder of Nature Exhibition 
Fantastic Beasts: The Wonder of Nature was open from 9–15 December 2020 and from 17 May 2021 to 3 January 2022 at the Natural History Museum. It consisted of creatures, specimens and artefacts from the museum's scientific collection displayed side by side with elements from the Wizarding World as well as digital installations. This exhibit featured 100 objects, including props from the Fantastic Beasts and Harry Potter films. There is a similar exhibition set to open at the Royal Ontario Museum in Toronto, Canada on 11 June 2022 through 2 January 2023

Harry Potter Film Concert Series 
The Harry Potter Film Concert Series is a global concert tour announced in 2016 as a partnership between WarnerBros and CineConcert. The concerts involve a screening of the film alongside the film's complete score played live by local orchestras. It premiered at Philadelphia's Mann Center for the Performing Arts on 23 June 2016. There have since been over 1,400 performances in 48 countries around the world with over three million fans.

Forbidden Forest Experience 
The Forbidden Forest Experience is a nighttime woodland trail with creatures and other experiences from the Harry Potter and Fantastic Beasts films. Visitors can have a wide range of food and drinks at the village. It is currently open in four locations in Arley Hall & Gardens, Northwich, England; which opened on 16 October 2021 and will close on 15 January 2022, Wetchester New York, Leesburg Virginia and in Kasteelstraat 37, 1750 Lennik, Belgium; which opened on 5 November 2022.

Harry Potter Land, Warner Bros World Abu Dhabi 
An extensive new Harry Potter themed land was announced to be coming to Yas Island, as part of the world’s largest indoor theme park, Warner Bros. World Abu Dhabi on 10th November 2022 by Warner Bros Discovery and Miral.

Books

Video games

See also 
 Fictional universe of Harry Potter
 Places in Harry Potter

References

External links 

 

 
Film franchises
Film series introduced in 2001
Warner Bros. Pictures franchises